Aintree Racecourse railway station was a station located on the North Mersey Branch, in Liverpool, England. It originally opened as Aintree Cinder Lane around 1890 as the only station on the line at the time, only opening for race days at Aintree Racecourse.

History

Opened by the Lancashire and Yorkshire Railway, it became part of the London, Midland and Scottish Railway during the Grouping of 1923. The line then passed on to the London Midland Region of British Railways on nationalisation in 1948. It was closed by the British Transport Commission. The platform was removed in 1969 but the line was continued to be used for freight until 1971. By 1987 the engineering depot at Fazakerley had closed and the line which ran through the station to Fazakerley sidings was removed. The route of the line was converted into a foot and cycle path during the 1990s and no evidence of the station remains.

References

External links
 Disused Stations article

Disused railway stations in the Metropolitan Borough of Sefton
Former Lancashire and Yorkshire Railway stations
Railway stations in Great Britain opened in 1890
Railway stations in Great Britain closed in 1962